David Bruce Aven (born March 4, 1972) is a former Major League Baseball outfielder. Aven attended and played baseball for the Lamar University Cardinals.

Aven played for four different ball clubs during his career: the Cleveland Indians (1997, 2002), Florida Marlins (1999), Pittsburgh Pirates (2000), and Los Angeles Dodgers (2000–2001).  He made his Major League Baseball debut on August 27, 1997.  Aven last played in a Major League game on May 27, 2002. He is now a baseball coach at American Heritage School in Plantation, Florida.

References

External links

1972 births
Living people
People from Orange, Texas
Baseball players from Texas
Major League Baseball left fielders
Cleveland Indians players
Florida Marlins players
Pittsburgh Pirates players
Los Angeles Dodgers players
Watertown Indians players
Kinston Indians players
Buffalo Bisons (minor league) players
Canton-Akron Indians players
Albuquerque Dukes players
Nashville Sounds players
Las Vegas 51s players
Scranton/Wilkes-Barre Red Barons players
Syracuse SkyChiefs players
Lamar Cardinals baseball players